Nawabpet may refer to: 

Nawabpet may refer to:

 Nawabpet, Mahbubnagar district, Telangana, India
 Nawabpet, Ranga Reddy, Telangana, India